Hills v. Gautreaux, 425 U.S. 284 (1976), was a decision of the United States Supreme Court.

In this case, a number of Chicago families living in housing projects were awarded Section 8 vouchers allowing them to move to the suburbs in compensation for the housing project's substandard conditions.  Carla Anderson Hills was the United States Secretary of Housing and Urban Development; the eponymous lead respondent was Dorothy Gautreaux (1927–1968). The court ruled that the department had violated the Fifth Amendment and the Civil Rights Act of 1964.

The significance of the case lies in the sociological conclusions that can be drawn from it. A number of families chose to move, while others stayed, and Northwestern University researchers studying the two populations concluded that low-income women who moved to the suburbs "clearly experienced improved employment and earnings, even though the program provided no job training or placement services." The disparity arguably proves that concentrated poverty is self-perpetuating and simply alleviating this concentration offers an avenue for improving the quality of life of those afflicted by urban poverty.

See also 
 List of United States Supreme Court cases, volume 425
 Office of Fair Housing and Equal Opportunity

References

External links
 
 Waiting for Gautreaux 2006 (Northwestern University Press), book by Alexander Polikoff, lead plaintiff's attorney in Gautreaux vs. Chicago Housing Authority et al.

United States equal protection case law
United States Supreme Court cases
1976 in United States case law
United States Supreme Court cases of the Burger Court